An accordion is part of a family of musical instruments.

Accordion may also refer to:
 Any object with features resembling an accordion or its bellows
 Accordion cut, a technique in butchery similar to butterflying
 Accordion (GUI), a graphical user interface widget displaying a list where individual members of the list can be expanded or collapsed
 Accordion (film), a 1934 Soviet musical film
 Accordion (solitaire), a solitaire card game
 "Accordion," a song by Madvillain from their album Madvillainy
 Accordion (company), an American consulting company

See also 
 Accordion effect, in physics
 The Accordionist, a 1911 painting by Pablo Picasso